Oliver K. Kelley (a.k.a. O.K. Kelley, born Olavi Koskenhovi; 28 June 1904 – 28 March 1987) was an engineer involved in developing the automatic transmission at the General Motors Corporation in the 1940s.

Early life and career
Kelley was born in Salo, Finland, on June 28, 1904. He immigrated from Finland in 1921 at age 17 and changed his name to Oliver K. Kelley. He was educated at Chicago Technical College, where he received B.S. and M.E. degrees graduating in 1925. Kelley worked for Nash Motor, Milwaukee, as a draftsman. In 1929 Kelley began working for the G.M.C. Truck and Coach Division, where he worked on transmission problems, including air-shift synchromesh bus transmissions, hydraulic torque-converter bus transmissions, and infinitely variable friction drives. In June 1936, Kelley joined Earl A. Thompson's engineering group at the General Motors (GM) Engineering Department. This group combined a fluid coupling with a unique hydraulically controlled, automatically shifting four-speed planetary transmission, introduced as an option on 1940 Oldsmobiles as Hydra-Matic, the world's first mass-produced fully automatic transmission.

In 1957, after 17 years as head of the transmission group, Kelley became chief engineer at Buick Motor Division. In 1960 Kelley went into GM's newly created Defense Systems Division as director of military vehicular systems In 1966-1967 Kelley was the E. S. executive assistant to the V.P.) 
Kelley Retired 1 Sept 1967 after 40 years with GM. Kelly died March 28, 1987 at the age of 82 in Bloomfield Hills, Michigan.

Notable achievements
In 1940, upon the departure of Earl A. Thompson, Kelley became the head of the GM transmission group where he was involved in developing, the Buick Dynaflow, Chevrolet Powerglide, Chevrolet Turboglide, and Buick Flight Pitch Dynaflow and Triple Turbine transmissions.

Awards
Recipient of a Citation at the awarding of Earl A. Thompson with the Elmer A. Sperry Award in 1963 for his part in the design and development of the first successful automatic automobile transmission

Automatic Transmission Patents

Kelley received over 82 U.S. and Canadian patents from 1929 - 1971 related to fluid couplings, torque converters, transmission designs, etc.
 1937/1939 US Patent US2176138 for Combination fluid turbo clutch and variable speed gearing
 1939/1940 US Patent US2211233  for Fluid flywheel gearing arrangement
 1941/1945 US Patent US2377696 for Transmission drive
Kelley also published several SAE Technical Documents on fluid couplings, torque converters, and planetary gear set design.

External links

20th-century American engineers
American automotive engineers
General Motors people
Torque converters
1904 births
1987 deaths
20th-century American inventors
Finnish emigrants to the United States